Rohan Bail (born 26 June 1988) is a former professional Australian rules footballer who played for the Melbourne Football Club in the Australian Football League (AFL).

Bail began his junior football career playing for the Ferny Grove Falcons and after competing in numerous seasons with the club moved to the Mount Gravatt Football Club to continue with senior football.

He was recruited from Mount Gravatt in the Queensland Australian Football League with Melbourne's final selection, number 64 overall, in the 2008 AFL Draft, after being overlooked in the previous two drafts.  He finished fourth in the 2008 Grogan Medal, awarded to the best player in the Queensland league.

Bail made his AFL debut in Round 19 of the 2009 AFL season, but had only one kick before he injured his quadriceps muscle.

He was delisted at the conclusion of the 2015 season, and in 2016  will play for St Kevin's Old Boys in Premier section of the VAFA.

Statistics

|- style="background-color: #EAEAEA"
! scope="row" style="text-align:center" | 2009
|style="text-align:center;"|
| 41 || 1 || 0 || 0 || 1 || 0 || 1 || 0 || 0 || 0.0 || 0.0 || 1.0 || 0.0 || 1.0 || 0.0 || 0.0
|- 
! scope="row" style="text-align:center" | 2010
|style="text-align:center;"|
| 44 || 9 || 4 || 0 || 83 || 71 || 154 || 40 || 32 || 0.4 || 0.0 || 9.2 || 7.9 || 17.1 || 4.4 || 3.6
|- style="background:#eaeaea;"
! scope="row" style="text-align:center" | 2011
|style="text-align:center;"|
| 44 || 8 || 1 || 3 || 83 || 62 || 145 || 25 || 40 || 0.1 || 0.4 || 10.4 || 7.8 || 18.1 || 3.1 || 5.0
|- 
! scope="row" style="text-align:center" | 2012
|style="text-align:center;"|
| 44 || 18 || 8 || 15 || 140 || 132 || 272 || 61 || 58 || 0.4 || 0.8 || 7.8 || 7.3 || 15.1 || 3.4 || 3.2
|- style="background:#eaeaea;"
! scope="row" style="text-align:center" | 2013
|style="text-align:center;"|
| 44 || 8 || 4 || 7 || 51 || 35 || 86 || 23 || 18 || 0.5 || 0.9 || 6.4 || 4.4 || 10.8 || 2.9 || 2.3
|- 
! scope="row" style="text-align:center" | 2014
|style="text-align:center;"|
| 44 || 21 || 10 || 4 || 189 || 137 || 326 || 79 || 92 || 0.5 || 0.2 || 9.0 || 6.5 || 15.5 || 3.8 || 4.4
|- style="background:#eaeaea;"
! scope="row" style="text-align:center" | 2015
|style="text-align:center;"|
| 44 || 6 || 1 || 3 || 36 || 30 || 66 || 18 || 15 || 0.2 || 0.5 || 6.0 || 5.0 || 11.0 || 3.0 || 2.5
|- class="sortbottom"
! colspan=3| Career
! 71
! 28
! 32
! 583
! 467
! 1050
! 246
! 255
! 0.4
! 0.5
! 8.2
! 6.6
! 14.8
! 3.5
! 3.6
|}

References

External links

DemonWiki player profile

Australian rules footballers from Queensland
Melbourne Football Club players
Mount Gravatt Football Club players
Living people
1988 births
Casey Demons players